The Praga BH-41, later redesignated E-41, was a military advanced trainer aircraft produced in Czechoslovakia during the 1930s.

Design and development
Designed in response to a Defence Ministry competition and based on the BH-39, it was a conventional biplane design with unstaggered two-bay wings of equal span. The pilot and instructor sat in open cockpits in tandem, and the fixed tailskid undercarriage featured divided main units. The powerplant had been specified by the government to be the Hispano-Suiza 8Fb which were then being manufactured under licence by Škoda.

The E-41 was selected as the winner of the competition, and a contract for 43 aircraft was signed. Praga also produced a version powered by a ZOD 260 radial diesel engine, designated the E-141. This was not a success and only a single prototype was built. In 1936, a BH-41 was fitted with a Walter Pollux II engine, and designated the E-241. Following successful trials, an order was placed for a second batch of aircraft, this time for 95 machines with this engine.

These aircraft continued service in the Slovak–Hungarian War and into the Second World War, when around 30 E-241s saw service with the Slovak Air Force in its campaign against the Soviet Union together with the German Luftwaffe.

Variants
 BH-41 or E-41 - original version with Hispano-Suiza 8Fb engine (43 built)
 E-141 - version with ZOD 260 engine
 E-241 - version with Walter Pollux II engine (95 built)

Operators

Czechoslovak Air Force

Luftwaffe
 Slovak Republic
Slovenské vzdušné zbrane

Specifications (E-241)

See also

Notes

References

External links 

  Praga E-41 (E-1, BH-41) and E-241

BH-41
1930s Czechoslovakian military trainer aircraft
Single-engined tractor aircraft
Biplanes
Aircraft first flown in 1931